Scopula moralesi is a moth of the family Geometridae. It is found in Morocco.

References

Moths described in 1945
moralesi
Moths of Africa